Omkar Prasad Nayyar (16 January 1926 – 28 January 2007) was an Indian film music composer, singer-songwriter, music producer, and musician. He is considered to be one of the most rhythmic and melodious music directors of the Hindi film industry. He won the 1958 Filmfare Award for Best Music Director for Naya Daur. Nayyar worked extensively with singers Geeta Dutt, Asha Bhosle, Mohammed Rafi, though not with leading Bollywood female singer Lata Mangeshkar.

O. P. Nayyar had recognised Kishore Kumar long before he became a popular singer. The film like Baap Re Baap (1955) is one of Kishore Kumar hits in the inimitable "O. P." style as well as the film Raagini (1958), but the relationship did not endure.

Early life and career
Nayyar was born in Lahore, British India (present Pakistan). He then underwent music training.
He composed the background score for Kaneez (1949), and 1952's Aasmaan (produced by Dalsukh M. Pancholi), was his first film as music director. Nayyar then composed music for Chham Chhama Chham (1952) and Baaz (1953). Film producer, director and actor Guru Dutt enlisted him to compose and conduct music for Aar Paar (1954), Mr. & Mrs. '55 (1955) and C.I.D. (1956). Nayyar's early work was primarily performed by Shamshad Begum, Geeta Dutt and Mohammed Rafi, with Asha Bhosle introduced in C.I.D. Nayyar never worked with Lata Mangeshkar, though her song Saari Saari Raat Teri Yaad Satayein from the 1958 film Aji Bas Shukriyawas used in the 1973 Hindi film Taxi Driver, for which he was the music director.

Nayyar's favorite Raga is Pilu in Hindustani classical music, its equivalent in Carnatic music being Kapi (raga)  which eventually remained source for majority of his compositions, but he has been able to mesmerize everyone with no clues.

In 1957 Filmalaya introduced Nasir Hussain, who wanted a composer to provide romantic scores for newcomers Shammi Kapoor and Ameeta. Nayyar's scores were featured in the Hussain films Tumsa Nahin Dekha (1957) and Phir Wohi Dil Laya Hoon (1964). During the decade, state-controlled All India Radio banned most of Nayyar's songs because the broadcaster considered them too "trendy".

According to music and film expert Rajesh Subramanian, "Aap Ke Haseen Rukh" (from Baharen Phir Bhi Aayengi) was planned with full orchestration but many of the musicians were late for the recording. After a disagreement with Mohammed Rafi, Nayyar began working with singer Mahendra Kapoor. Kapoor performed Nayyar's song "Badal Jaaye Agar Maali, Chaman Hotaa Nahi Khaali" in Bahaaren Phir Bhi Aayengi. Based on a Bengali language work by Rabindranath Tagore, Nayyar composed "Chal Akelaa, Chal Akelaa" (sung by Mukesh in 1969 film Sambandh).

Nayyar co-produced songs with Shamshad Begum (including "Kajra Mohabbatwala"), and after Madhubala's 1969 death Vyjayanthimala, Sadhana, Mala Sinha, Padmini, Asha Parekh and Sharmila Tagore lip-synced several Nayyar-Bhosle songs. Nayyar and Bhosle parted ways in 1974, and he then worked with Dilraj Kaur, Krishna Kalle, Vani Jayaram and Kavita Krishanmurthy. Majrooh Sultanpuri and Sahir Ludhianvi wrote the lyrics for some of Nayyar's earlier songs, including "Naya Daur". Nayyar also worked with developing lyricists such as Jan Nisar Akhtar, Qamar Jalalabadi, S. H. Bihari and Ahmed Wasi. He began the tradition of assigning full, three-minute songs to comedians. Om Prakash sang Nayyar's "Churi Bane Kanta Bane" in Jaali Note and Eent ki dukhi paan ka ikka in Howrah Bridge and Johnny Walker sang "Aye Dil Hai Mushkil Jeena Yahaan" in CID, "Jaane Kahan Mera Jigar Gaya Jee" in Mr. & Mrs. 55, "Main Bambaika Baaboo, Naam Meraa Anjaanaa" in Naya Daur and "Bajewala" in Basant.

In addition to songs for Asha Bhosle and Geeta Dutt's, Thandi Thandi Hawaa, Nayyar wrote "Yeh Desh Hai Veer Jawaanonkaa" (featuring Dilip Kumar and Ajit) for Naya Daur (1957). The song earned him the 1958 Filmfare Best Music Director Award. The last Nayyar song performed by Bhosle was "Chain Se Humko Kabhi". Intended for Pran Jaye Par Vachan Na Jaye (1973), disappeared in the film's final cut but won Bhosle the 1975 Filmfare Award for Best Female Playback Singer. Nayyar was less active in the 1970s and did not compose music for younger actors such as Rajesh Khanna and Amitabh Bachchan. His films included Dilip Kumar, Raj Kapoor, Dev Anand, Guru Dutt, Dharmendra, Shammi Kapoor, Joy Mukherjee, Biswajit, Feroz Khan, Bharat Bhushan, Madhubala, Asha Parekh, Sadhana, Mumtaz, Sharmila Tagore, Rajshree, Rekha, Ameeta and Shyama. In addition to Hindi films, Nayyar composed for Neerajanam 1989 film in Telugu. He made a brief comeback during the 1990s with Mangni and Nishchay in 1992 and Zid in 1994.
O.P. Nayyar played a major part in shaping up Asha's career, but Asha rarely mentions it. She mentions S. D. Burman's name instead. Why OP and Asha parted away in 1974, neither of them ever talked about it.

Personal life
In retirement Nayyar stayed in touch with only a few people, including Gajendra Singh and Ahmed Wasi; Singh included him as a judge for his television show, Sa Re Ga Ma Pa. Wasi interviewed Nayyar twice on Vividh Bharati and presented a series of six one-hour episodes, Mujhe Yaad Sab Hai Zaraa Zaraa, about his life.

In last years of his life, he stayed at Eden Woods Complex, Thane, and breathed his last at Thane. 

He had two brothers: P. P. (a physician) and G. P. (a retired army dentist in Secunderabad, who died in 2010). Nayyar's wife, Saroj Mohini Nayyar, wrote the lyrics to "Preetam Aan Milo" (originally sung by C. H. Atma in 1945 which was used later in the film Mr. & Mrs. '55 by Geeta Dutt). Estranged from his family, he requested that they be barred from his funeral. Nayyar had moved out of his Mumbai home, staying with a friend in Virar and then with a friend in Thane. He died on 28 January 2007, survived by his wife, three daughters and a son. Nayyar's death was followed by tributes from many Bollywood figures, including Lata Mangeshkar, Sharmila Tagore, Mumtaz, Mahesh Bhatt, Khayyam, Shakti Samanta, Sonu Nigam, Ravindra Jain, Anu Malik, B. R. Chopra and Shammi Kapoor. A commemorative stamp was issued by India Post on 3 May 2013. His granddaughter Niharica Raizada is also an actress.

Filmography

 Aasman (1952)
 Chham Chhama Chham (1952)
 Baaz (1953)
 Aar Paar (1954)
 Mangu (1954)
 Mehbooba (1954)
 Mr. & Mrs. '55 (1955)
 Baap Re Baap (1955) 
 Miss Coca Cola (1955)
 Musafir Khana (1955)
 Sabse Bada Rupaiya (1955)
 Bhagam Bhag (1956)
 Chhoo Mantar (1956)
 C.I.D. (1956)
 Dhake Ki Malmal (1956)
 Ham Sab Chor Hain (1956)
 Mr. Lambu (1956)
 Naya Andaz (1956)
 Shrimati 420 (1956) 
 Bare Sarkar (1957)
 Qaidi (1957)
 Ustad (1957)
 Johnny Walker (1957)
 Duniya Rang Rangeeli (1957)
 Mai Baap (1957)
 Naya Daur (1957)
 Tumsa Nahin Dekha (1957)
 12 O'Clock (1958)
 Farishta (1958)
 Howrah Bridge (1958)
 Kabhi Andhera Kabhi Ujala (1958)
 Mr. Cartoon M. A. (1958)
 Mujrim (1958)
 Phagun (1958)
 Raagini (1958)
 Sone Ki Chidiya (1958)
 Do Ustad (1959)
 Jaali Note (1960)
 Kalpana (1960)
 Basant (1960)
 Mitti Mein Sona (1960)
 Hong Kong (1962)
 Ek Musafir Ek Hasina (1962)
 Phir Wohi Dil Laya Hoon (1963)
 Kashmir Ki Kali (1964)
 Mere Sanam (1965)
 Akalmand (1966)
 Baharen Phir Bhi Aayengi (1966)
 Do Dilon Ki Dastan (1966)
 Love and Murder (1966)
 Mohabbat Zindagi Hai (1966)
 Sawan Ki Ghata (1966)
 Yeh Raat Phir Na Aaygi (1966)
 C.I.D. 909 (1967)
 Nasihat (1967)
 Humsaya (1968)
 Dil Aur Mohabbat (1968)
 Kahin Din Kahin Raat (1968)
 Kismat (1968)
 Shrimanji (1968)
 Sambandh (1969)
 The Killers (1969)
 Aisa Bhi Hota Hai (1971)
 Ek Bar Muskura Do (1972)
 Taxi Driver (1973)
 Pran Jaye Par Vachan Na Jaye (1974) 
 Khoon Ka Badla Khoon (1978)
 Heera Moti (1979)
 Bin Maa Ke Bachche (1980)
 Muqaddar Ki Baat (1983) (Unreleased) 
 Salaam Bombay! (1988)
 Neerajanam (1989) (Telugu Film) 
 Mangni (1992)
 Nishchaiy (1992)
 Zid (1994)

Albums
 The Best Of O. P. Nayyar Vol. 1 to Vol. 6
 Parichay – Introduction To India's Musical Geniuses (O. P. Nayyar)|Parichay – Introduction To India's Musical Geniuses
 OP Nayyar-Penaz Masani – Dekho Mohabbat Ka Dastoor
 OP Nayyar-Penaz Masani – Jaane Do (1990)
 OP Nayyar-Ashok Khosla – Naye Kapde Badlkar
 OP Nayyar-Ashok Khosla – Ajnabi Shehar Mein
 OP Nayyar-Runa Laila – Allah Ne Is Dil Ne
 OP Nayyar-Runa Laila – Kehdo Is Raat Se
 OP Nayyar-Runa Laila – Wadiyan Wadiyan
 Golden Collection – O. P. Nayyar (compilation)
 O. P. Nayyar, Asha Bhosle – Sunheri Yaadein

References

External links
 
 List of Hindi songs composed by Nayyar

1926 births
2007 deaths
20th-century Indian musicians
Indian male playback singers
Indian male film score composers
Filmfare Awards winners
Hindi film score composers
People from Lahore
Punjabi people
20th-century Indian male singers
20th-century Indian singers